KCTQ-LP (101.5 FM) was a radio station licensed to Charlo, Montana, United States. The station was owned by Confederated Salish & Kootenai Tribes Disaster & Emergency Services.

The station's broadcast license was cancelled by the Federal Communications Commission on December 12, 2012, as the station had been silent for longer than twelve months.

References

External links
 

CTQ-LP
CTQ-LP
Native American radio
Radio stations disestablished in 2012
Defunct radio stations in the United States
2012 disestablishments in Montana
CTQ-LP